Senator Rockwell may refer to:

Francis W. Rockwell (politician) (1844–1929), Massachusetts State Senate
Irvin E. Rockwell (1862–1952), Idaho State Senate
Julius Rockwell (1805–1888), Massachusetts State Senate
Robert F. Rockwell (1886–1950), Colorado State Senate
Samuel Rockwell (1803–1880), Connecticut State Senate
William W. Rockwell (1824–1894), New York State Senate